WLTH (1370 AM) is a radio station in Gary, Indiana east of the Chicago metropolitan area. It is owned by Michilliana Broadcasting, LLC. The station's current format is African-American Talk Radio.

Notable radio alumni of WLTH include Steve King (later of WLS, and now with WGN); Felicia Middlebrooks (retired from WBBM); Michael King (now with WXIA-TV); Tommy Williams (later of WSCR); Dinahlynn Biggs over 38 years on air with over 500, 000 listeners of the popular show:The Dinahlynn Biggs Show until June 2017 now on Chicago Radio, R.Veronica Williams (later with Chicago Public Radio WBEZ 91.5 FM later of Radio-One Indianapolis WLTC AM 1310 "The Light"/106.7 WTLC-FM.

Current hosts include: Jeffrey Smith on "Midday News Desk", "The Drive from 2 - 5" Monday thru Friday features Karen Williams and Steve Williams (not related) with Old School music and entertainment news, Verle Harris and Natalie Ammons, Bill Kaye "The BK Report", Scott Cannon (A.K.A. The Khemist)& Rev. Delwyn Campbell on "Issues & Answers: Friday Nights" , Dr. Ruth Needleman and Lorell K on "Issues & Answers" Thursdays. Currently on Saturday nights the "Brothers of the Blues" blues radio program is on from 8pm until Midnight.

In September 2013, the station changed its location from Merrillville, Indiana, to its original city of Gary- specifically, 478 Broadway and then moved to 115 W. 5th Avenue in 2016.

References

External links

LTH
Mass media in Gary, Indiana